The 76.2 mm anti-aircraft gun Model 1935 (34-K) is a  Soviet naval anti-aircraft gun. It was developed during the 1930s and used during World War II.

Background
The 55-caliber gun was derived from a German weapon licensed in 1930. The initial attempt to put the gun on a naval mount was a failure. The Kalinin factory started work in 1934 on a new design that was accepted in late 1936. It entered production before the end of the year as the 34-K and 285 were built before the end of 1941. The same mount was combined with the Army  gun as the 90-K system beginning in 1942.

Development of a twin-gun electrically powered mount also began in 1936, but it was not accepted until October 1939 as the 39-K. Only 15 mounts were produced before production ceased.

Notes

Bibliography

Anti-aircraft guns of the Soviet Union
World War II artillery of the Soviet Union
World War II anti-aircraft guns
76 mm artillery
Naval guns of the Soviet Union
Naval anti-aircraft guns